The Iepureni (also: Epureni) is a left tributary of the river Jijia in Romania. It flows into the Jijia in Iacobeni.

References

Rivers of Romania
Rivers of Iași County